The constitutional provisions in India on the subject of distribution of legislative powers between the Union and the States are defined primarily under its articles 245 and 246. The Seventh Schedule to the Constitution of India specifies the allocation of powers and functions between the Union and the State legislatures. It embodies three lists; namely, the Union List, the State List, and the Concurrent List. The Union list enumerates a total of 97 subjects over which the power of the Union parliament extends. Similarly, the State list enumerates a total of 66 subjects for state legislation. The schedule also spells out a Concurrent list embodying a total of 47 subjects on which both the Union parliament and the state legislatures are empowered to legislate, though this is subject to the other provisions of the constitution that give precedence to the union legislation over that of the states. 

In addition to demarcating the subjects of Union legislation from those of the states, Article 248 of the constitution also envisages residual powers not catered for in either of the Union or State lists for the Union. It provides, “The Union Parliament has exclusive power to make any law with respect to any matter not enumerated in the Concurrent List or the State List.” Additionally, the constitution also empowers the Union parliament via clause 4 of the Article 246 to legislate for the Union territories on all subjects, including those enumerated in the State list.

Union List 

The Union List is a list of 97 subjects numbered items as provided  in the Seventh Schedule to the Constitution of India. The Union Government or  Parliament of India has exclusive power to legislate on matters relating to these items.

State List 

The State List is a list of 66 subjects in the Schedule Seven to the Constitution of India. The respective state governments have exclusive power to legislate on matters relating to these items.

Concurrent List 

There are 47 items currently in the list: This includes items which are under joint domain of the Union as well as the respective States.

See also
 Constitution of India

References

Notes 

Indian documents
History of the Republic of India
7
Federalism in India